Seven Bridges may refer to:

 Seven Bridges, Reading, a street named after a series of bridges over streams of the River Kennet
 Seven Bridges of Königsberg, a notable historical problem in mathematics
 Seven Bridges Road (album), a 1972 album by country rock musician Steve Young
 "Seven Bridges Road", the album's title track, covered by The Eagles and others

See also
Severn Bridge (disambiguation)